Luc E. Weber (born 18 September 1941) is the Rector Emeritus of the University of Geneva and the President of the Glion Colloquium.

Biography
Luc E. Weber received a PhD in Economics and Business from the University of Lausanne. From 1975 to 2008, he was Professor of Public Economics at the University of Geneva. He has also taught at his alma mater, the University of California, Los Angeles, and the University of Fribourg. From 1977 to 1980, he was a member of the Swiss Council of Economic Advisers. He has also served as Vice-Rector, then Rector of the university, and Chairman and Consul for international affairs of the Swiss University Rectors’ Conference.

He was a founding member of the European University Association. He is a co-founder of the Glion Colloquium. He was also a member and later Chair of the Steering Committee for Higher Education and Research of the Council of Europe. From 2002 to 2008, he was Treasurer and Vice-President of the International Association of Universities. He is a member of the Austrian Accreditation Council, serves on the administrative board of the University of Strasbourg, the Jean Monnet Foundation for Europe, the Foundation Board of the International Red Cross and Red Crescent Museum. He also works for the World Bank.

Bibliography
Governance in Higher Education: The University in a State of Flux, Luc E. Weber (author), Werner Hirsch (author) (2001)
As the Walls of Academia Are Tumbling Down, Luc E. Weber (ed.), Werner Zvi Hirsch (ed.) (2003)
Reinventing the Research University, Luc E. Weber (ed.), James Johnson Duderstadt (ed.), 2004
Public Responsibility for Higher Education And Research (co-edited with Sjur Bergan, 2005)
Universities and Business: Partnering for the Knowledge Society, Luc E. Weber (ed.), James Johnson Duderstadt (ed.), 2006
The Legitimacy of Quality Assurance in Higher Education: The Role of Public Authorities and Institutions, (co-edited with Katia Dolgova-Dreyer, 2007)
The Globalization of Higher Education (Glion Colloquium), Luc E. Weber (ed.), James Johnson Duderstadt (ed.), 2008
University Research for Innovation, Luc E. Weber (ed.), James Johnson Duderstadt (ed.), (2010)

References

Living people
Swiss economists
Rectors of the University of Geneva
University of California, Los Angeles faculty
World Bank people
1941 births
University of Lausanne alumni
Swiss officials of the United Nations